Shuravil is a village in the Ardabil Province of Iran.

References

External links

Tageo

Populated places in Ardabil Province